Martha & Ethel is a 1994 documentary film directed by Jyll Johnstone.  It premiered at the 1994 Sundance Film Festival and was nominated for the Grand Jury Prize. It was subsequently nominated for a Directors Guild of America award, losing to Steve James for Hoop Dreams. The film was distributed in theaters by Sony Pictures Classics and on home video by Columbia TriStar Home Video.

Synopsis
Martha & Ethel tells the stories of two women in their 80s: a German-Catholic woman named Martha and an African-American woman named Ethel, the former nannies of director/producer Jyll Johnstone and co-producer Barbara Ettinger. It examines each woman’s background and hiring into affluent New York families. The Johnstone and Ettinger children, now grown, reflect on how Martha and Ethel played formative—and often confusing—roles in their lives.

Reception
Upon release, the film received mostly positive reviews. It currently (as of August 2009) maintains a 100% "freshness" rating on review aggregation website rottentomatoes.com, based on five reviews. Roger Ebert gave the film three stars and called it "as fascinating for what it doesn't say as for what it does."

External links
 
 
 Film Summary on Canobie Films website
 Washington Post Review of the film
 New York Times Review of the film
 Variety's Analysis of the film

References

1994 films
American documentary films
1990s English-language films
1990s American films
Sony Pictures Classics films